Plane Table is a distinctive ice free mesa in the north part of the Asgard Range, Victoria Land. This flattish feature surmounts the area between Nibelungen Valley and the Sykes Glacier and commands an extensive view of Wright Valley. Its name was given by the New Zealand Antarctic Place-Names Committee.

Plane Table Glacier is a short, tapering glacier on the north side of Plane Table that extends part way down the south wall of Wright Valley, Victoria Land. It was named in 1997 by the Advisory Committee on Antarctic Names in association with Plane Table.

Mesas of Antarctica
Glaciers of Victoria Land
Landforms of Victoria Land
McMurdo Dry Valleys